Andreas Johansson (born 10 March 1982), also known as Ante G, is a Swedish footballer who plays as a centre back and midfielder for Halmstads BK.

Club career

Halmstads BK

Johansson was born in Getinge (Halland) in the southwest of Sweden. He started to play football with five years at local side Getinge IF, but moved at the age of 15 to Halmstads BK. When he arrived at Halmstads BK there was another player in the club with the name Andreas Johansson, to separate the players they were each given a nickname based upon where they have come from, Andreas Johansson (born 1982) was called "Ante G" (Getinge), while the other Andreas Johansson was nicknamed "Ante V" (Vallås).

After four years in the reserve team he made his debut in 2002 against Örgryte IS and established himself quickly as a regular player in the team. In the coming years he played 165 matches for the club and scored nine goals. A second place in 2004 was the biggest success in this period.

VfL Bochum
On 22 June 2009, Johansson left Halmstads BK and signed a contract with Bundesliga club VfL Bochum for an undisclosed fee and on 1 July he joined the German club.

International career
Playing several matches for the Swedish U-21 team, he made his debut for the Senior team on 29 January 2009 in a match against Mexico
during Sweden's yearly friendly tournament in USA.

Career statistics

References

External links
 
 
 

1982 births
Living people
Swedish footballers
Sweden youth international footballers
Sweden under-21 international footballers
Sweden international footballers
Allsvenskan players
Association football midfielders
Halmstads BK players
VfL Bochum players
VfL Bochum II players
IFK Norrköping players
Bundesliga players
2. Bundesliga players
Regionalliga players
Expatriate footballers in Germany
Sportspeople from Halmstad
Sportspeople from Halland County